The 1975 American Airlines Tennis Games was a men's tennis tournament played on outdoor hard courts. It was the 2nd edition of the Indian Wells Masters and was an ATP sanctioned tournament but was not part of the WCT or Grand Prix seasons. The tournament was played in Tucson, Arizona in the United States and ran from March 31 through April 6, 1975. Twelfth-seeded John Alexander won the singles title.

Finals

Singles 

 John Alexander defeated   Ilie Năstase 7–5, 6–2

Doubles 

 Raúl Ramírez /  William Brown defeated   Raymond Moore /  Dennis Ralston 2–6, 7–6, 6–4

References

External links
 
 ITF tournament edition details

 
American Airlines Tennis Games
American Airlines Tennis Games
American Airlines Tennis Games
1975 Grand Prix (tennis)
1975 in American tennis
Indian Wells Masters